The Fiat G.5 was an Italian two-seat aerobatic tourer or trainer designed and built by Fiat Aviazione in small numbers.

Development
Designed originally as a two-seat light aerobatic trainer the G.5 was a low-wing cantilever monoplane powered by a 135 hp (101 kW) Fiat A.70 radial piston engine. It had fixed tailwheel landing gear and tandem open cockpits for the instructor and pupil.

The type was built in small numbers and was followed by a prototype G.5/2 with an inverted inline 140 hp (104 kW) Fiat A.60. A small number was also built of the final variant G.5bis which was fitted with a higher output 200 hp (149 kW) Fiat A.70 engine.

Later history and operations
 
Some aircraft were later modified to single-seat configuration.
One example of the G.5bis, registered I-BFFI, survived in civil ownership and operation until at least 1955 and is now preserved in a museum.

Variants
G.5
Production variant with 135hp (101kW) Fiat A.70 radial engine.
G.5/2
Prototype with a 140hp (104kW) Fiat A.60 inline engine.
G.5bis
Improved variant with a 200hp (149kW) Fiat A.70 radial engine.

Specifications (G.5bis)

References

Notes

Bibliography

G.005
1930s Italian sport aircraft
Low-wing aircraft
Single-engined tractor aircraft
Aircraft first flown in 1933